The Žiča Monastery (or ) is an early 13th-century Serbian Orthodox monastery near Kraljevo, Serbia. The monastery, together with the Church of the Holy Dormition, was built by the first King of Serbia, Stefan the First-Crowned and the first Head of the Serbian Church, Saint Sava.

Žiča was the seat of the Archbishop (1219–1253), and by tradition the coronational church of the Serbian kings, although a king could be crowned in any Serbian church, he was never considered a true king until he was anointed in Žiča. Žiča was declared a Cultural Monument of Exceptional Importance in 1979, and it is protected by Serbia. In 2008, Žiča celebrated 800 years of existence.

Background

Founding of Serbian Church

The Serbs were initially under the jurisdiction of the Archbishopric of Ohrid, under the tutelage of the Ecumenical Patriarch of Constantinople. Rastko Nemanjić, the son of Stefan Nemanja, ruled as Grand Prince of Hum 1190-1192, previously held by Grand Prince Miroslav. In the autumn of 1192 (or shortly thereafter)

Rastko joined Russian monks and traveled to Mount Athos where he took monastic vows and spent several years. In 1195, his father joined him, and together they founded the Chilandar, as the base of Serbian religion. Rastko's father died in Hilandar on 13 February 1199; he was later  canonised, as Saint Simeon. Rastko built a church and cell at Karyes, where he stayed for some years, becoming a Hieromonk, then an Archimandrite in 1201. He wrote the Karyes Typicon during his stay there.

He returned to Serbia in 1207, taking the remains of his father with him, which he relocates to the Studenica monastery, after reconciling Stefan Nemanja II with Vukan, who had earlier been in a succession feud. Stefan Nemanja II asked him to remain in Serbia with his clerics. He founded several churches and monasteries, including the Žiča monastery.

Foundation
The monastery was founded by King Stefan Prvovenčani and Saint Sava, in the Rascian architectural style, between 1208 and 1230, with the help of Greek masters.

Stefan the First-Crowned аlsо ordered that the future Serbian kings аrе tо be crowned at Žičа.

History

In 1219, the Serbian Church gains autocephaly, by Emperor Theodore I Laskaris and Patriarch Manuel I of Constantinople, and Archimandrite Sava becomes the first Serbian Archbishop. The monastery acts as the seat of the Archbishop of all Serbian lands. Saint Sava crowning his older brother Stefan Prvovenčani as "King of All Serbia" in the Žiča monastery. In 1221, a synod was held in the Monastery of Žiča, condemning Bogomilism.

When Serbia was invaded by Hungary, Saint Sava sent Arsenije I Sremac to find a safer place in the south to establish a new episcopal See. In 1253 the see was transferred to the Archbishopric of Peć (future Patriarchate) by Arsenije. The Serbian primates had since moved between the two.

In 1289-90, the chief treasures of the ruined monastery, including the remains of Saint Jevstatije I, were transferred to Peć.

In 1219, Žiča became the first seat of the Serbian Archbishopic. The church, dedicated to the Ascension of Our Lord, displays the features of the Raska school. The ground plan is shaped as a spacious nave with a large apse at its eastern end. The central space is domed. The church was built of stone and brick. Architecturally, the Byzantine spirit prevails. There are three layers of painting, each being a separate entity. The earliest frescoes were painted immediately after the first archbishop Sava's return from Nicaea (1219), but only in the choir portions of these have been preserved. Sometime between 1276-92 the Cumans burned the monastery, and King Stefan Milutin renovated it in 1292-1309, during the office of Jevstatije II. Patriarch Nikon joined Despot Đurađ Branković when the capital was moved to Smederevo, following Turkish-Hungarian wars in the territory of Serbia in the 1430s.

Renovation was carried out during the time of Archbishops Jevstatije II (1292-1309), and Nikodim (1317-37), when the refectory was adorned with frescoes, the church covered with a leaden roof, and a tower erected. The new frescoes were painted during the reign of King Milutin, but they have since suffered serious damage. Fragments have survived to the present day on the east wall of the passage beneath the tower (composition of King Stefan Nemanja II and his firstborn son Radoslav), in the narthex, nave and side-chapels.

During the Uprising in Serbia in 1941, the first skirmishes within the Siege of Kraljevo began in the early afternoon on 9 October 1941 near Monastery of Žiča when the Chetnik unit commanded by Milutin Janković attacked German unit which retreated to Kraljevo after a whole day battle in which Germans used canons to shell the monastery. On 10 October German air forces bombarded the Monastery of Žiča using five airplanes and significantly damaged its church. The battle near monastery lasted until early morning of 11 October when Germans broke the rebel lines and put the monastery to fire.

Frescoes
Frescoes depicting Pantocrator.

Gallery

See also
Studenica
Sopoćani
Mileševa
Visoki Dečani
Gračanica
Nemanjić dynasty
Spatial Cultural-Historical Units of Great Importance
Tourism in Serbia
Architecture of Serbia
There is a village near the Greek city of Ioannina (NW Greece, region of Epirus), also named Zitsa. It was founded during the Late Middle Ages, probably when the Serbs had gained a short-lived control over the Despotate of Epirus, and historians believe that it was named after the monastery.

References

Bibliography
 
 
 
 Stevović, Ivan. "A hypothesis about the earliest phase of Žiča katholikon." Zograf 38 (2014): 45-58.
 Vojvodić, Dragan. "On the trail of the lost frescoes of Žiča." Zograf 34 (2010): 71-86.
 Vojvodić, Dragan. "On the trail of the lost frescoes of Žiča (II)." Zograf 35 (2011): 145-54.

External links

 Official website of Serbian Imperial Lavra - Žiča monastery
 Aerial video of Žiča

13th-century Serbian Orthodox church buildings
Cultural Monuments of Exceptional Importance (Serbia)
Serbian Orthodox monasteries in Serbia
Architecture in Serbia
Coronation church buildings
Tourism in Serbia
Saint Sava
Monasteries of the Eparchy of Žiča